Shyama Charan Shukla (27 February 1925 –  14 February 2007) was an Indian National Congress politician and thrice Chief Minister of Madhya Pradesh.

Personal life
Shyama Charan Shukla was born on 27 February 1925 in Raipur. His father Ravishankar Shukla was a lawyer, an Indian National Congress politician from Central Provinces and Berar and the first Chief Minister of Madhya Pradesh.  His younger brother, Vidya Charan Shukla, was also an INC politician, a union minister, and a nine-time Member of Parliament in the Lok Sabha.

His son Amitesh Shukla is an INC politician and currently a Member of Legislative Assembly of Chhattisgarh from Rajim.

Political career
Shyama Charan Shukla was first elected as a member of the Madhya Pradesh Legislative Assembly from Rajim in 1957. He was re-elected from the same seat in 1962, 1967, 1972, 1990, 1993 and 1998. He lost from Rajim in 1977.

Shukla served as the Chief Minister of Madhya Pradesh on three occasions - 1969-72, 1975–77 and 1989-90.

In 1999, he was elected as a Member of Parliament in the Lok Sabha from Mahasamund, and served till 2004.

Memorials
India Post issued a postage stamp depicting his photo in 2012 as a memorial.

External links

External links
 Profile on Loksabha website
 news article

1925 births
Indian National Congress politicians
People from Madhya Pradesh
People from Chhattisgarh
Banaras Hindu University alumni
Chief Ministers of Madhya Pradesh
India MPs 1999–2004
People from Raipur, Chhattisgarh
2007 deaths
Madhya Pradesh MLAs 1957–1962
Madhya Pradesh MLAs 1962–1967
Madhya Pradesh MLAs 1967–1972
Madhya Pradesh MLAs 1972–1977
Madhya Pradesh MLAs 1990–1992
Madhya Pradesh MLAs 1993–1998
Madhya Pradesh MLAs 1998–2003
Chhattisgarh MLAs 2000–2003
Lok Sabha members from Madhya Pradesh
Lok Sabha members from Chhattisgarh
Leaders of the Opposition in Madhya Pradesh
People from Gariaband district
Chief ministers from Indian National Congress
Indian National Congress politicians from Madhya Pradesh